Richard Thompson (26 August 1914 – 12 June 1998) was an American animator who worked at several animated cartoon departments over a career of four decades.

Career
Thompson's longest association was with Chuck Jones at Warner Bros. Cartoons and MGM Animation/Visual Arts. Notably, he was an animator on Chuck Jones' Road Runner cartoons. He also worked at Hanna-Barbera and DePatie–Freleng Enterprises. He animated for Tom and Jerry cartoons; for one Peanuts animated special, He's Your Dog, Charlie Brown; and for two Babar TV specials by Mendelson-Melendez Productions, The Story of Babar, the Little Elephant and Babar Comes to America.

References

External links

1914 births
1998 deaths
American animators
American animated film directors
Warner Bros. Cartoons people